The Thanksgiving Day Classic is an annual doubleheader held on Thanksgiving in the Canadian Football League (CFL). It is typically one of two days in which the league plays on a Monday afternoon; the other is the Labour Day Classic. Unlike the Labour Day Classic, the teams in the Thanksgiving Day Classic rotate each year. Purolator is the presenting sponsor of the event as of 2022.

The Montreal Alouettes have traditionally been given hosting duties for the opening game. This was originally started in 1997 to compensate for not being part of the Labour Day Classic festivities; Montreal and the various Ottawa franchises normally play on Labour Day when both franchises are active. The Alouettes' permanent hosting of Thanksgiving remained in place after Ottawa returned to the league in 2014.  The Hamilton Tiger-Cats played CFL games annually in all but three years between 1958 and 1982, hosting the vast majority of them; Hamilton also hosted three times in four years from 1990 to 1993 and again hosted a Thanksgiving matchup in 2013 due to stadium construction disrupting their hosting of the 2013 Labour Day Classic.

Since the CFL's creation in 1958 to the 2018, there have been 120 games played on Thanksgiving Day. The 2019 CFL season was the first in league history to feature no games on Thanksgiving Day. The league scheduled the Classic for the 2020 CFL season, with one game being played on Thanksgiving Day. However, due to financial issues stemming from the COVID-19 pandemic in Canada, the entire 2020 CFL season was cancelled and this game was not played. 

Despite Canadian Thanksgiving being a legal holiday in the United States (as Columbus Day or Indigenous Peoples' Day), none of the CFL's American teams ever played the Thanksgiving Day Classic. The games have also not been televised live in the United States since 2009, although one of the two was broadcast on tape-delay in 2013.

Possible discontinuation or reformatting
In late 2017, a proposal emerged to move the start of the CFL season to five or six weeks earlier than it begins in the present day, so that the Grey Cup would be held on the third weekend of October, as opposed to the fourth Sunday in November as it stands as of 2018. The change, designed to accommodate a potential U.S. television agreement with NFL Network, has support among CFL owners and would, if approved, take effect for the 2019 CFL season. If the proposal were to take effect, Thanksgiving Day weekend would overlap with the CFL's conference championship games. While this change was not implemented and the season schedule remained the same, the league did not schedule any Thanksgiving Day games in 2019. The league has indicated that such a schedule change would need to be negotiated in the league's collective bargaining agreement with the players' association. The CBA at the time expired in 2019; at the same time, the league renewed its existing agreement with ESPN, making a schedule change unnecessary, and the new CBA approved that year made no provision for a change.

Results

By year

By appearance

See also
American football on Thanksgiving

References

Thanksgiving
Canadian Football League
Montreal Alouettes
Annual television shows
Hamilton Tiger-Cats
October sporting events
1958 establishments in Canada
Recurring sporting events established in 1958